Aghiles or Aghilas is a Berber name mainly widespread in the Kabylie region and in the Tamanrasset region of Algeria.It literally means "young lion" in the Amazigh language.

Notable people named Aghlies include:
 Aghilès Benchaâbane, Algerian footballer
 Aghiles Slimani, Algerian swimmer

Berber languages